Tyler Blinn Duffey (born December 27, 1990) is an American professional baseball pitcher in the Chicago Cubs organization. He has previously played in Major League Baseball (MLB) for the Minnesota Twins.

Amateur career
Duffey attended Bellaire High School in Bellaire, Texas. He then enrolled at Rice University to play college baseball for the Rice Owls baseball team. He was named Most Valuable Player of the 2011 Conference USA baseball tournament. After the 2011 season, he played collegiate summer baseball with the Falmouth Commodores of the Cape Cod Baseball League. In May 2012, he was named the Conference USA pitcher of the week.

Professional career

Minnesota Twins
The Minnesota Twins selected Duffey in the fifth round, with the 160th overall selection, of the 2012 MLB draft. He signed with the Twins and pitched for the Cedar Rapids Kernels in 2013, before receiving a promotion to the Fort Myers Miracle of the Class A-Advanced Florida State League. He began the 2014 season with Fort Myers, and was promoted to the New Britain Rock Cats of the Class AA Eastern League, and then the Rochester Red Wings of the Class AAA International League.

The Twins invited Duffey to spring training as a non-roster player for 2015. He opened the season with the Chattanooga Lookouts of the Class AA Southern League, and was promoted to Rochester in May. With Tommy Milone going on the disabled list, the Twins promoted Duffey to the major leagues to make his major league debut on August 5, 2015. Duffey finished the season strong, ending with a 5–1 record in 10 starts for the Twins and poising himself for a rotation spot in 2016.

After starting the season in AAA due to a logjam in the rotation, Duffey was called up on April 24. Duffey recorded his first major league hit, a sacrifice bunt, on April 24, 2016, in National League play against the Washington Nationals.

On June 26, 2016, Duffey took a perfect game through 5.2 innings until it was broken up by Aaron Hicks. The Twins would still win 7–1 over the Yankees. Despite his 6.43 ERA, Duffey finished the season in the rotation, leading the team in wins as he went 9–12 in 26 starts.

In 2017, Duffey was moved to the bullpen and became exclusively a relief pitcher. He appeared in 56 games and amassed a record of 2–3 with a 4.94 ERA. He made the Twins' roster in 2018 in the same role. He was sent down multiple times throughout the season to AAA, having appeared only in 19 games for the Twins. Duffey was converted into a reliever for the 2019 season and excelled in the role, registering an ERA of 2.50 in 58 games.

With the 2020 Minnesota Twins, Duffey appeared in 22 games, compiling a 1–1 record with 1.88 ERA and 31 strikeouts in 24.0 innings pitched.

On May 20, 2021, Duffey was suspended two games after throwing at Chicago White Sox catcher Yermín Mercedes in a game on May 18.

On August 5, 2022, Duffey was designated for assignment by the Twins. He was released on August 10, 2022.

Texas Rangers
On August 12, 2022, Duffey signed a minor league deal with the Texas Rangers. He opted out of his contract and became a free agent on August 28, 2022.

New York Yankees
On August 30, 2022, Duffey signed a minor league deal with the New York Yankees. He made seven appearances for the Triple-A Scranton/Wilkes-Barre RailRiders, struggling to a 10.50 ERA and 1–1 record with eight strikeouts in 6.0 innings pitched. He elected free agency on November 10, 2022.

Chicago Cubs
On January 27, 2023, Duffey signed a minor league contract with the Chicago Cubs organization.

Personal life
Duffey's mother, Shanna, died in 2012 after complications from breast cancer led to a blood clot.

Duffey married his high school sweetheart, Sarah Hutchins, on December 19, 2015, and they had their first child, a son, in 2020.

References

External links

1990 births
Living people
Baseball players from Houston
Major League Baseball pitchers
Minnesota Twins players
Rice Owls baseball players
Falmouth Commodores players
Elizabethton Twins players
Cedar Rapids Kernels players
Fort Myers Miracle players
New Britain Rock Cats players
Rochester Red Wings players
Chattanooga Lookouts players
Round Rock Express players